The Main building (commonly shortened to Hauptuni) is the central headquarters of the University of Vienna, it is located in the first district of Vienna and faces the so called Universitätsring. It was designed by Heinrich Ferstel and built in 1873.

History
Duke Rudolph IV established the University of Vienna March 12, 1365. Heinrich von Ferstel designed the Main building and it was opened by Emperor Franz Joseph I in 1884.

References

University of Vienna
Buildings and structures in Vienna
School buildings completed in 1873